Amer Kamal (born 13 September 1987, in Sudan) is Sudanese footballer who plays for Al-Merreikh SC in Sudanese Premier League. He is a member of Sudan national football team, played at 2012 Africa Cup of Nations.

References 

1987 births
Living people
Sudanese footballers
Sudan international footballers
2012 Africa Cup of Nations players
Association football defenders
Al-Merrikh SC players